The following is a list of fictional characters from the 2004 Disney/Pixar computer-animated superhero film The Incredibles and its 2018 sequel Incredibles 2.

The Parr Family (The Incredibles)

Bob Parr (Mr. Incredible)

Robert "Bob" Parr (a.k.a. Mr. Incredible) (voiced by Craig T. Nelson in the films, Pete Docter in Mr. Incredible and Pals, Richard McGonagle in Rise of the Underminer, and Jeff Bergman in Lego The Incredibles) possesses superhuman strength, stamina, and durability. He is married to Helen Parr, the superheroine known as Elastigirl, and they have three children together: Violet, Dash, and Jack-Jack. His face was physically modeled after director Brad Bird.

Sometime after his marriage, Mr. Incredible was sued by Oliver Sansweet for thwarting his suicide and the passengers of the train he stopped from running off the tracks which was part of the events that led to the government quietly initiating the Superhero Relocation Program. Bob found forced retirement difficult, and often had to cheat his way out of the house on Wednesdays so that he could continue his superheroics. He was shocked to discover that his "Number 1 fan", Buddy, had recreated himself as the supervillain Syndrome after Mr. Incredible had squelched Pine's wish to be his ward in an attempt to protect him. It was not until Syndrome threatened his family that Bob realized that they were his "greatest adventure".

His red superhero suit, designed by Edna Mode, appears to have the same level of durability as Mr. Incredible himself. In his prime, Mr. Incredible drove a gadget-laden car, the Incredibile, reminiscent of those driven by James Bond or Batman. The silhouette of a newer version of the Incredibile for the entire family is seen in the end credits of the first film, and the new car makes a full appearance at the end of the second film.

Mr. Incredible was ranked number 5 in IGN's list of the Top 10 Pixar Characters. Readers of Empire magazine also voted Mr. Incredible number 8 in that magazine's list of The Top 20 Pixar Characters.

Helen Parr (Elastigirl)

Helen Parr (a.k.a. Elastigirl or Mrs. Incredible) (voiced by Holly Hunter) is Mr. Incredible's wife. Helen can stretch any part of her body up to 300 feet and can be 1 mm thin. She can also reshape her body in a variety of ways.  In the movie she becomes a parachute and a rubber boat, and has used her arms for swings and a slingshot. In her early years she seemed to be a feminist and had no desire to "settle down". Since her marriage to Bob, Helen has become a dedicated spouse and mother, although she is frustrated with her husband's continuing dreams of glory. Helen is also an experienced jet pilot, from having a close friend who flew her around the world when she was a Super. Her sharp wit and superb espionage skills, as well as her experience as a superhero, make her an excellent tactician and leader. The filmmakers drew inspiration from actresses Mary Tyler Moore, Marilyn Monroe and Audrey Hepburn for Helen's role and appearance in the sequel.

Her red superheroine suit, designed by Edna Mode, can stretch as far as she can and still retain its shape. It is virtually indestructible yet it breathes like Egyptian cotton

Gina Bennett, interviewed by Maureen Dowd as part of a group of current and former CIA professionals, said "the Band of Sisters had a favorite crime fighter .... Just think of us as a work force of Elastigirls."

Violet Parr

Violet Parr (voiced by Sarah Vowell) is a 14-year-old junior high school teenager stuck at the crossroads between girl and woman. Violet desperately wants to be like everyone else, to blend in with normal people, and not to stand out. Her superpowers allow her to turn instantly invisible, and to generate spherical force fields to protect herself and also to levitate extremely heavy objects; the interiors of the force fields have an anti-gravitational effect, allowing Violet to levitate inside, but she can be stunned temporarily if the field is struck by a sufficiently large force.

During the first film, she and Dash combine their powers to create the IncrediBall (named in the video game), a tactic in which Violet generates a force field around herself, and Dash uses his speed power to use the ball like a cannonball or battering ram. Her struggle with her shyness and lack of confidence constitutes a major side story in the movie; she is spurred on by Helen's encouragement that she has more power than she realizes and that she just has to believe it. In the end, Violet sheds her shyness and ends up at the confident side when her crush Tony Rydinger asks her for a date.

Unlike her normal clothes, her red superheroine suit, designed by Edna Mode, also turns invisible when Violet does.

Dash Parr

Dashiell "Dash" Robert Parr (voiced by Spencer Fox in the first film, Huck Milner in the second film) is a speedster. While he is only as strong as the average 10-year-old boy, the film's official website lists "enhanced durability" amongst Dash's powers, which is implied in the film by the amount of incidental high-speed collisions and crashes Dash endures without apparent injury. Dash also discovers throughout the course of the movie that his speed allows him to be able to run over water without submerging.

Dash would like to go out for sports, but his mother Helen will not allow it because she thinks that he would show off his superspeed and blow the family's civilian cover. To vent his frustration, Dash uses his power to play pranks on his teacher, Bernie Kropp, which also threatens their cover.

Dash's reckless and impulsive nature and one-track mind have put him at odds with Violet's gloomier and more sarcastic nature more often than their parents would like, but when Dash is in battle, he cares deeply about his family; he was willing to attack a fully grown man who was about to kill his sister.

His red superhero suit, designed by Edna Mode, is resistant to air friction, wear and heat when Dash is running at super speed.

Jack-Jack Parr

John Jackson "Jack-Jack" Parr (voiced by Eli Fucile and Maeve Andrews in the first film, Fucile and Nicholas Bird in the second film) is the Parrs' infant son, the youngest of the Parr children. Initially believed to be the only family member without any powers and shown as a minor character (as he did not join the family in the first film), he manifests a multitude of superhuman abilities at the end of the first film, most of which are types of shapeshifting, when Syndrome tries to kidnap him. More powers are seen in the short film Jack-Jack Attack on the Incredibles DVD, making his powers the most versatile of the family, and according to a collectible poster included with some Incredibles toys, still more powers are undisclosed.

Although Edna Mode did not know what powers Jack-Jack might develop, she covered various possibilities by making him a fireproof and bulletproof blanket sleeper-like jumpsuit. Creator Brad Bird explains on the DVD that Jack-Jack's varied abilities are a metaphor for how young children have infinite possibilities ahead of them in life. He begins to manifest a broader range of powers during Incredibles 2, inspiring Edna to upgrade his suit with sensors that allow his family to track him or rein in his powers via remote control.

Jack-Jack was ranked number 15 in Empire magazine's list of the Top 20 Pixar Characters.

Allies

Frozone
Lucius Best (a.k.a. Frozone) (voiced by Samuel L. Jackson in the films, Isaac C. Singleton Jr. in Rise of the Underminer, and John Eric Bentley in Lego The Incredibles) is a long-time friend of the Parr family. Frozone is Bob Parr's best friend, and was the best man at Bob and Helen's wedding. Similar to the Marvel Comics superhero Iceman, Frozone has the power to freeze water, or even ambient moisture in the air. He is limited by the amount of water available, either in liquid form, or in the air. It is also indicated that he can use the moisture of his own body, and that dehydration weakens his abilities as a result. During the first film, it is suggested that he has adapted to civilian life much more easily than his long-time friend, Bob Parr, though he still possesses a hidden cache containing his costume and all of his old gadgets in working condition.

Lucius married an unseen woman whom he refers to as Honey (voiced by Kimberly Adair Clark), who is aware of his superhero past, but is unsupportive of his public-minded ideals. Lucius is best friends with Bob, and a close friend of Helen and the kids, who are the only supers he socializes with following the banning of superheroes. Whenever Lucius and Bob go out on Wednesdays to engage in superheroics, they have to cover from their respective wives by claiming to be going bowling, but they stop going out when Bob is caught by Helen. Lucius's super suit is designed to keep him warm in the cold, but he must wear a special set of refraction goggles not only to protect his identity, but also to protect his eyes from the glare of the sunlight that bounces off his ice crystals. The soles of Frozone's snow boots can change into ice skates, alpine ice skis, and a concave disc he uses as a snowboard. These forms of transport, combined with chutes of ice, result in particularly speedy travel.

Frozone was ranked number 16 in Empire magazine's list of the Top 20 Pixar Characters.

Frozone returns in Incredibles 2. He helps the Incredibles stop the Underminer's drill, and after the battle learns of Winston Deavor's offer to restore public trust in superheroes, bringing Helen and Bob with him to meet Deavor together. He is later overwhelmed by other hypnotized Supers when he unsuccessfully attempts to protect the Parr children from them, and is put under Evelyn's mind control via goggles. However, he is freed by Helen and her children and aids in foiling Evelyn's plan.

Edna Mode

Edna "E" Mode (voiced by Brad Bird) is an eccentric fashion designer who designs the costumes for many members of the superhero community. To that end, not only does she take the aesthetics of the clothes into account, but also their practical uses such as protective qualities and accommodation to the powers of the wearer. She was a guest at Mr. Incredible and Elastigirl's wedding. Rick Dicker, who felt that Edna was "difficult" to work with, was the one who first referred Elastigirl to Edna. Edna was conceived as an amalgam between James Bond's gadget supplier, Q, and Oscar-winning costume designer Edith Head. Pixar artist Teddy Newton, who co-designed the character, stated that the film's animators looked for inspiration in the 1995 fashion documentary Unzipped, which spotlighted a number of designers, including Isaac Mizrahi and Polly Mellen. Edna Mode also appeared with Pierce Brosnan to present the Academy Award for Costume Design at the 77th Academy Awards. Edna refuses to design super suits with capes in light of the number of supers having unfortunate accidents because their capes got caught in airliner turbines, elevators, missiles, etc. The film's creators originally could not find an appropriate actress to voice Edna. Finally, when asking actress Lily Tomlin to voice Edna, Brad Bird provided an example of what she should sound like. Tomlin told Bird that he successfully captured her voice so well that he should provide it in the film himself, which Bird did.

Edna Mode was ranked number 8 in IGN's list of the Top 10 Pixar Characters, and number 6 in Empire magazine's list of the Top 20 Pixar Characters.

When Bob visits Edna to get his old super suit patched up in The Incredibles, she is inspired to create new suits for the entire family, including Jack-Jack even though he has not yet exhibited any powers. She returns in Incredibles 2, offering to babysit Jack-Jack for an exhausted Bob, and upgrades Jack-Jack's suit with sensors that allow the family to track him and curb his newly manifested powers via remote control. The time she spends looking after Jack-Jack is the focus of the short Auntie Edna.

Rick Dicker
Rick Dicker (voiced by Pixar animator Bud Luckey in the first film, Jonathan Banks in the second film) is a government agent who was once part of the NSA (National Supers Agency) and now oversees the Superhero Relocation Program. He was one of the guests present at Mr. Incredible and Elastigirl's wedding. Rick is often frustrated by Bob clinging on to the "Glory Days", which usually ends up in Rick having to erase memories and repair damage caused by Bob's actions. By the first film's conclusion, Dicker congratulates Bob and his family after they stop the Omnidroid and expose Syndrome's plot.

Rick Dicker also appears in the short film Jack-Jack Attack where he interrogates Jack-Jack's babysitter Kari about the events that unfolded while she was babysitting Jack-Jack and then erases Kari's memories at the end. In the DVD commentary, Brad Bird jokes that he had an idea to start Luckey's short film Boundin' with Rick Dicker coming into his office late at night, pulling out a bottle of "booze" and a banjo to begin telling the story.

Rick returns in Incredibles 2. He informs the Parr family that his department's Super Relocation program is being shut down, forcing supers across the world to permanently adhere to their secret identities. He then goes on to tell the family that they are on their own now and that he cannot help them any longer, although he manages to get them to live in a motel for two weeks after the destruction of their house in the first film,  and informs them he is going into forced retirement. After Violet's classmate and crush Tony, who had recently agreed to go out on a date with Violet, witnesses Violet in her super-suit without her mask during the battle with the Underminer, Bob asks him to erase that memory in order to protect Violet's secret identity. However, Dicker accidentally erases Tony's entire memory of Violet, for which she is heartbroken.

Snug
Snug is an old friend of Helen Parr, presumably from her super days as Elastigirl. He never appears in the films, but his voice can be heard on the phone when Helen calls him to acquire a jet to access Syndrome's island (in The Incredibles). Snug can be seen in a photograph held by Helen that shows the two of them in aviation gear. In a deleted scene, Snug was intended to travel with them on the plane to the island and would be killed in the following crash with the missiles, but this was rewritten to have Helen pilot the plane solo instead.

Winston Deavor
Winston Deavor (voiced by Bob Odenkirk) is an ardent superhero fan who leads a telecommunications company with his sister Evelyn. In Incredibles 2, he wants to re-legalize supers, whose activities have been outlawed by the government, through a marketing campaign. Winston selects Helen Parr to carry out a publicity stunt as Elastigirl in order to regain the general public's support of supers, and houses the Parr family in a luxurious mansion. His sister, however, places him under her control via hypnotic signals transmitted by television screens, as part of her scheme to permanently undermine the legal status of supers. She intends to do this by sabotaging a summit of supers and similarly hypnotized political delegates taking place on the Deavors' cruise ship by crashing the ship into the city. When Winston is freed from her control, he aids in foiling Evelyn's plan to collide his cruise ship into the city by reboarding the runaway ship and freeing the delegates to then ensure their safety, while the supers attempt to regain control of the ship. He later presumably explains the truth of his sister's scheme to the delegates and to the authorities to legalize the superheroes again.

Civilians

Oliver Sansweet
Oliver Sansweet is the president of a bank in Municiberg. While en route to his wedding, Mr. Incredible sees him jump off a building and saves him, which results in injuries to Sansweet in the process. Following the incident, Sansweet sues Mr. Incredible in Superior Court for preventing his suicide. His lawyer states that he did not want to be saved, and that injuries he sustained in the incident cause him daily pain. Sansweet's lawsuit against Mr. Incredible, as well as a series of other Super-related lawsuits, leads the government to initiate the Superhero Relocation Program.

Gilbert Huph
Gilbert Huph (voiced by Wallace Shawn) is Bob Parr's diminutive, strict supervisor at his insurance company Insuricare. His main priority at Insuricare is its profits despite concerns from the company's staff or its customers. He is a stickler for maintaining Insuricare's profit margin, and prefers that customers remain unaware of any loopholes that would help secure an insurance claim.

When Huph refuses, during harsh reprimand of Bob for helping too many clients secure claims, to allow Bob to leave their meeting to stop a mugging he sees out in the street, the mugger manages to escape after injuring his victim. This prompts Bob to lose his temper, and throw Huph through several office walls, leaving him hospitalized and in traction, and resulting in Bob's termination from Insuricare. A deleted scene on the film's official website shows that his memories of the incident were erased by Rick Dicker.

Bernie Kropp
Bernard "Bernie" Kropp (voiced by Lou Romano) is a teacher at Dash Parr's school, on whom Dash regularly pulls pranks. After sitting on a tack placed on his seat at his desk, Kropp sends Dash to the principal's office where they conference with Helen Parr. Kropp reveals that he had secretly videotaped the incident with Dash, which he claims "proves" Dash placed the tack on his desk chair. However, the principal is unconvinced and Dash is allowed to leave with Helen with no school repercussions, infuriating Kropp.

Tony Rydinger
Anthony "Tony" Rydinger (voiced by Michael Bird) is a junior high school teenager, attending the same school as Violet Parr. Violet harbors a secret crush on him. In the end of The Incredibles, with boosted confidence, Violet manages to attract Tony's attention and he asks her out on a date, which she accepts.

Tony returns in Incredibles 2. It is revealed that Tony accidentally witnessed Violet in her supersuit unmasked during their battle with the Underminer, which resulted in Rick Dicker being forced to wipe Tony's memory of the day, including that of Violet and his planned date with her. Following Evelyn Deavor's defeat, Violet is forced to start from scratch with Tony, asking him out to the movies again. However, she is forced to leave him at the cinema (with the promise of returning quickly) when a new threat calls for the Incredibles to take action.

Kari McKeen
Kari McKeen (voiced by Bret Parker) is a friend of the Parrs, whom Violet calls upon to babysit Jack-Jack while the rest of the family are flying to save Mr. Incredible (in The Incredibles). She has taken numerous babysitting classes and feels more than adequately prepared to care for Jack-Jack in any capacity, and assures Helen Parr to that effect. She has one scene in the film, and she is heard later on Mrs. Parr's voice mail, complaining that some "very weird things" are happening; she does apparently learn all of Jack-Jack's powers as she has a defense for all of them after one day. Her eventful night with the baby (see above) is documented in the Jack-Jack Attack short included on the DVD release, ending with Rick Dicker erasing her memory of the incident.

Ambassador Henrietta Selick
Ambassador Henrietta Selick (voiced by Isabella Rossellini) is a dignified foreign official committed to the support and legalization of superheroes. She is rescued by Elastigirl in Incredibles 2, when Evelyn attempts to kill her in her helicopter through her hypnotic screens.

Antagonists

Syndrome
Buddy Pine, a.k.a. Syndrome (voiced by Jason Lee) is the main antagonist of The Incredibles. His primary motivation as a villain is his hatred of superheroes, stemming from his experience with Mr Incredible. Like Bob Parr, his character was also physically modeled after Brad Bird. He has no superhuman powers, but he is highly intelligent, having invented numerous weapons and high-tech vehicles that use such principles as robotics, anti-gravity, and zero-point energy, which he sold to black market buyers to make himself rich. He owns his own island, complete with a mansion, a sophisticated monorail system, missiles, and a staff of guards equipped with exotic vehicles of Syndrome's design.

In The Incredibles, Buddy Pine first appears as a 10-year-old child  who professes to be Mr. Incredible's "number 1 fan". In an attempt to earn his hero's respect, Buddy tries to aid him in fighting crime as "IncrediBoy", using gadgets of his own invention. Mr. Incredible declines Buddy's offer, and during a subsequent conflict between Mr. Incredible and the supervillain Bomb Voyage, Buddy interferes, and ends up with a bomb attached to his cape. Mr. Incredible's removal of it leads to the destruction of a section of elevated train tracks, which requires him to save the approaching train. Mr. Incredible then hands Buddy over to the police to have them take him home and inform his mother of his actions, bluntly telling Buddy that he works alone, leaving Buddy feeling rejected and disillusioned.

Fifteen years later, Buddy has recreated himself as an evil genius called Syndrome who plans to exact revenge on his former idol, whom he now regards as his nemesis. He starts by having his assistant Mirage lure a series of Supers to his lair on Nomanisan Island under the cover of a job offer so that his Omnidroids can be improved by killing each one. After capturing the Parrs, Syndrome unleashes a massive Omnidroid upon Metroville, so that he can portray himself as a superhero who destroys it, when in fact, he is in control of it himself. However, the Omnidroid's adaptive intelligence leads it to turn against Syndrome. After freeing themselves and journeying to Metroville, the Parr family and Frozone destroy the Omnidroid. The authorities freeze Syndrome's assets and issue a warrant for his arrest. Syndrome abducts Jack-Jack with the intention of raising him as a sidekick, but he fails due to the sudden emergence of Jack-Jack's powers, and is killed when his cape is caught in his jet's intake.

Syndrome was named the 64th Greatest Villain Ever by Wizard magazine, Screen Rant have described his characterisation as “a geeky kid” as being humorous despite his prowess as a villain. while Rolling Stone ranked him as the 22nd best Pixar character.

Omnidroid
The Omnidroids are a series of intelligent and destructive robots developed by Syndrome to fight and kill Supers. Syndrome made many different versions of this battle robot. All were designed to fight and kill Supers, and each subsequent model improved upon the previous one by correcting flaws and weaknesses found during fights. The Omnidroid's only weakness is itself: in the film, Mr. Incredible climbs into the Omnidroid's internal structure, causing the robot to pierce its own armor in a vain attempt to pry Mr. Incredible out of itself.

The Omnidroid series of robots were designed by Syndrome to use AI and destructive features such as claws and laser guns to target and destroy its enemies. It is self-learning and can correct its own mistakes, and also collects information on the superheroes it encounters.

Omnidroids were used to kill various superheroes - each time a superhero eventually defeated an Omnidroid, data from the defeated version was then used to create an improved model, specifically designed to have functions to beat the superhero who had previously destroyed it. Through the instructions of Mirage, the superheroes do not fully destroy the Omnidroid as "it is government property".

The final Omnidroid created by Syndrome was controlled via a remote, which he uses to appear as a superhero by "destroying" it after launching it himself into Metroville. However, the Omnidroid learns that Syndrome is controlling it and turns on him. The Omnidroid is eventually destroyed by the combined efforts of the Parr family and Frozone when a separated claw is used to rip out its power core.

The Incredibles credits includes the sentence, "The term OMNIDROID used by permission of Lucasfilm Ltd". George Lucas apparently holds a trademark on the term "droid" (the word used to refer to the robots in the Star Wars franchise) and as "Omnidroid" has the term "droid" in it, permission was requested (and granted) from Lucasfilm to use the term in the film.

Mirage
In the first film, Mirage (voiced by Elizabeth Peña) is Syndrome's seductive right-hand woman and accomplice in the deaths of many Supers. Though she has no superhuman abilities, she has extensive computer and espionage skills. In her video-tablet message to Mr. Incredible she mentions that according to the government, neither of them officially exist.

Mirage is amoral to the point where she assists with Syndrome's systematic murder of the Supers. She has a change of heart when Syndrome shows callous disregard for Elastigirl and the children on board the plane, and after he takes a gamble on her life, daring an imprisoned Mr. Incredible to kill her. She subsequently frees him, and helps his family escape the island.

Bomb Voyage
Bomb Voyage (voiced by Dominique Louis) is a mime-themed French supervillain who uses explosives and an enemy of Mr. Incredible. The character's name is a pun on the French phrase "Bon Voyage". He is first seen in The Incredibles confronting Mr. Incredible when stealing money from a bank vault. Buddy Pine, Mr. Incredible's long-time fan, interrupts their impending showdown and tries to convince Mr. Incredible to let Buddy help. As Buddy flies off to get the police, Voyage plants a bomb on his cape, forcing Mr. Incredible to release him to save Buddy, thus allowing Voyage to escape.

Brad Bird originally pitched a character named Bomb Pérignon in reference to the similarly named champagne Dom Pérignon, but the Moët et Chandon company rejected the idea.

Voyage makes a cameo in the 2007 Pixar film Ratatouille as a street mime.

The Underminer
The Underminer (voiced by John Ratzenberger) is a mole-like supervillain who appears at the end of The Incredibles riding on a gigantic drill-tipped tank, where he announces his "war on peace and happiness", leading into the last shot of the Parr family putting their masks on for battle.

This confrontation is continued at the beginning of Incredibles 2; after declaring war, the Underminer drills back underneath the ground and blows up the ground-areas holding up the Metroville Bank. The Underminer then uses a vacuum hose to rob all of the savings in the Bank's Vault, while Mr. Incredible tries to stop him. The Underminer is able to store all of the money in an escape pod, and escapes from his tank before it runs out of control. The main tank is then disabled by the Parrs and Frozone. This battle, which caused collateral damage to the city, leads to the Superhero Relocation Program being shut down, and the warning by the government of legal action against Supers if they cause any more damage.

Screenslaver
In Incredibles 2, Evelyn Deavor (voiced by Catherine Keener) is the sister of Winston Deavor and the chief designer for DevTech. She creates the masked villain persona Screenslaver in order to carry out her plans to hypnotize and control people undiscovered. When the Screenslaver himself is seemingly unmasked by Elastigirl, he turns out to be a confused pizza delivery driverman (voiced by Bill Wise, who also provides the voice of Screenslaver when masked) who had been hypnotized by his mask's goggles into following Evelyn's orders. Evelyn forces another pair of goggles onto Elastigirl and reveals her plan to ruin Winston's summit so that the supers will fail to regain legal status. After gaining control of Mr. Incredible, Frozone, and several other supers, she is thwarted when Dash, Violet, and Jack-Jack free their parents, and Winston exposes Evelyn's plans to the world leaders. Evelyn attempts to flee while setting the summit ship on a collision course with the city of Municiberg. However, the supers stop the ship just in time, and Evelyn is captured and turned over to the police. Her name is a pun based on the phrase "evil endeavor."

List of known superheroes
Most of the following information comes from one of four main sources, two of which are scenes from the first film. The first is Edna Mode's explanation to Bob of why she refuses to design supersuits with capes, which is accompanied by a montage of a number of late supers' deaths. The second is when Bob hacks into Syndrome's computer files. The third is the "NSA Files" feature in the "Top Secret" section of Disc 2 of The Incredibles two-disc DVD edition. A minor amount of information, such as information on Fironic, comes from other scenes in the film, as noted.

 Apogee - Her superpowers involved gravity control and levitation, which were powered by sunlight. She was a former member of The Thrilling Three, along with Gazerbeam and Phylange. Apogee believed that The Thrilling Three was really The Thrilling 1 + 2 in Gazerbeam's mind. The Operation Kronos database assigned her a threat rating of 6.5. She was killed by the Omnidroid v. X4 during the training sessions for Operation Kronos.
 Blazestone - Her superpowers involved the control of fire and the production of pyrotechnic discharges. She was a member of Beta Force and was once partners with Frozone before their partnership soured even when Frozone and Downburst competed for her affection. The Operation Kronos database assigned her a threat rating of 5.5. She was killed by the Omnidroid v. X2 during the training sessions for Operation Kronos.
 Blitzerman - His superpowers were unknown as the only mention of his powers were the words "High-powered...", seen in a close-up of his profile in Syndrome's Operation Kronos files. He was killed by a version of the Omnidroid, as early as version X4 but before X9.
 Downburst - In the film, his superpowers are given by Syndrome's Operation Kronos files as gaseous downburst, but in the "NSA Files" feature on Disc 2 of the DVD, his powers are indicated to be atomic manipulation, meaning he could disrupt the atomic force among atoms. A member of Beta Force, he had an unrequited crush on Blazestone, but harbored a dislike of Frozone due to them competing for Blazestone's affection. The Operation Kronos database assigned him a threat rating of 6.5. He was killed by the Omnidroid v. X3 during the training sessions for Operation Kronos.
 Dynaguy - He had the ability to project a disintegration ray from his forehead and could fly courtesy of ion propulsion gauntlets. He was present as a guest at Mr. Incredible and Elastigirl's wedding. Dynaguy was one of the first supers sued (for public endangerment) following the Mr. Incredible lawsuits. He was killed when his cape got snagged during a takeoff. Following his death, Gazerbeam replaced him as leader of The Thrilling Three.
 Everseer - His superpowers included telepathy, clairvoyance, and "magnoscopic vision", with which he could see microscopically and telescopically. At one time, he was the leader of the Phantasmics and later fired Gazerbeam over a rivalry between the two. Everseer had a British accent in the audio file in the "NSA Files" feature on Disc 2 of the DVD. The Operation Kronos database assigned him a threat rating of 3.2. Because of his ability to see things like germs, he suffered from obsessive-compulsive disorder. He shared a therapist practice with Psycwave. He was killed by the Omnidroid v. X1 during the training sessions for Operation Kronos.
 Fironic - Near the end of the film, a woman mistook Syndrome—who had just saved her and others from being crushed by a tanker truck which the Omnidroid v.10 had hurled at them—for this superhero. He only appears in a flashback scene in Incredibles 2, where it is shown that he and Gazerbeam were friends with Winston and Evelyn Deavor's father before his death.
 Gamma Jack - His superpower was the ability to create controlled bursts of radiation. He believed supers to be a "superior race." The Operation Kronos database assigned him a threat rating of 7.9. Gamma Jack did manage to destroy one prototype Omnidroid during the training sessions for Operation Kronos, but was killed by its successor. The exact versions are unknown, but they were at least as early as version X5, but before X9.
 Simon J. Paladino (a.k.a. Gazerbeam) - He is a super mentioned and briefly seen in The Incredibles. His powers allow him to generate energy blasts from his eyes. According to his biography on the DVD, Gazerbeam was originally a member of the superhero team The Phantasmics, but rivalry with team leader Everseer led to Gazerbeam's dismissal. Following the death of Dynaguy, Gazerbeam replaced him as leader of the Thrilling Three, along with previously established members Phylange and Apogee. In-group tensions and arguments eventually led the threesome to disband. When the public began suing superheroes for damages done, Gazerbeam's true identity of Simon J. Paladino was a pro-bono lawyer who entered politics to become a long-time advocate for superhero rights. Gazerbeam appears alive only once in the film—as a guest during Mr. Incredible and Elastigirl's wedding—and is mostly seen in photos or mentioned by others. He was featured in a Super postage stamp collection alongside Frozone, Elastigirl and Mr. Incredible; this is seen among Mr. Incredible's selection of memorabilia. His disappearance (in his civilian identity) was reported in an article in the Metroville Tribune newspaper, which is how Bob first learned of his disappearance. His address is shown to be Traction Avenue, in the financial district of Metroville (the street where Operation Kronos is put into effect).In the film, Frozone compares Mr. Incredible's difficulties in adjusting to civilian life with those of the recently disappeared Gazerbeam, who experienced similar problems. As events would reveal, Gazerbeam was killed on Nomanisan Island while attempting to disable an Omnidroid – the same machine that took the lives of the other members of the Thrilling Three. The exact version was not revealed, but it was at least as late as version X4, but before X8, the first version later faced by Mr. Incredible. He apparently discovered the reason for his mission—i.e., Operation Kronos—and used his powers to burn the word "KRONOS" into a cavern wall on the island before his death. Mr. Incredible locates Gazerbeam's skeletal remains by chance while attempting to evade Syndrome and his Omnidroid; Mr. Incredible then uses the remains to convince Syndrome that he had been killed by one of Syndrome's mini-bombs. Mr. Incredible proceeds to sneak back into Syndrome's base and access the Operation Kronos computer, using Gazerbeam's final message as the password.
 Hyper Shock - His superpower was the ability to generate seismic waves with his fists, with which he could create earthquake-like disruptions measuring 6.0 on the Richter scale. He also used dual seismic amplification hammers to amplify this effect, though the maximum range of this amplification is unknown. The Operation Kronos database assigned him a threat rating of 7.5. Hyper Shock managed to destroy the Omnidroid v. X3 during the training sessions for Operation Kronos, but was then killed by its successor, the Omnidroid v. X4.
 Macroburst - According to the government file on the DVD, Macroburst is an androgynous superhero, to the point that their gender is actually not known by the government. Their superpower was the ability to project a high velocity winds. Macroburst was a sidekick to Everseer, and later a member of the Phantasmics. The Operation Kronos database assigned them a threat rating of 5.9. Macroburst was the first Super to score a victory over an Omnidroid, defeating the Omnidroid v. X1 during the training sessions for Operation Kronos. Unfortunately, they were then killed by the successor to the v. X1, the Omnidroid v. X2. Macroburst is one of five Supers without an audio file; Rick Dicker claims that it was damaged during a mission, and that although it was recovered, NSA Division Delta determined it to be incomplete.
 Meta-Man - His superpowers included flight, enhanced strength, x-ray vision, a sonic scream, teleportation, magnetic manipulation, partial invisibility and the ability to communicate with aquatic animals. He was one of the guests present at Mr. Incredible and Elastigirl's wedding. One of his enemies was Baron von Ruthless (whom Dicker assumes to be responsible for the absence of Meta-Man's audio file—it was presumably confiscated during a surprise attack by von Ruthless; Frozone also mentions von Ruthless). He was killed when his cape got caught in steel framework while lifting an express elevator back into place.
 Phylange - An opera singer in his civilian life, his superpower was the ability to project sonic fields with his voice, similar to Marvel's Banshee. He was a former member of The Thrilling Three, along with Gazerbeam and Apogee. The Operation Kronos database assigned him a threat rating of 4.7. He was killed by the Omnidroid v. X2 during the training sessions for Operation Kronos.
 Plasmabolt - Her superpowers involved shooting waves of plasma. She could also project electromagnetic energy, which was gathered from the antenna mounted on the head of her super suit, and channelled to her hands. Her body also exhibited an electromagnetic aura. She was a member of the Phantasmics. She was not seen in the movie, but in the "NSA Files" file on Disc 2 of the DVD as one of five Supers without an audio file; Dicker says that hers was inadvertently erased by her electromagnetic aura and that a re-recording has been scheduled.
 Psycwave - Her superpowers included mental force wave generation, temporary mental paralysis, and the ability to possess the bodies of others. A member of the Phantasmics, she shared a therapist practice with Everseer. The Operation Kronos database assigned her a threat rating of 1.6, the lowest rating of the Supers displayed. She was killed by the Omnidroid v. X1 during the training sessions for Operation Kronos.
 Splashdown - Flight and water-based superpowers. He was capable of underwater high-speed travel and communication with undersea life. He was sucked into the vortex of a waterspout by his cape and went missing. He is one of five Supers without an audio file. Dicker says that his is irretrievable due to water damage.
 Stormicide - The Operation Kronos file seen in the movie listed her powers as electrical discharges and gale-force bursts, but the NSA Files on the DVD, Disc 2, which was clearer, and corroborated by an audio file of an interview with Stormicide, indicated that her power was the absorbance and expulsion of a variety gases, such as oxygen, carbon dioxide, carbon monoxide, etc. The Operation Kronos database assigned her a threat rating of 6.7. She was killed by an Omnidroid during the training sessions for Operation Kronos. The exact version is unknown, but it was at least as early as version X5, but before X9.
 Stratogale - Gifted with the superpowers of flight, superstrength and the ability to communicate with birds, Stratogale had just pulled a commercial jet airliner out of a steep dive on April 23, 1957, after a serious emergency occurred to its #2 jet turbine. When she flew up in front of the left wing while waving at the passengers, her cape was sucked into the damaged engine, pulling her in and killing her. She was one of the guests present at Mr. Incredible and Elastigirl's wedding and is the last of five Supers without an audio file, with Dicker saying that hers has been deemed incomprehensible, suspecting either faulty recording equipment or a high level of ambient wind noise.
 Thunderhead - Gifted with storm-controlling powers, courteous, and "good with kids", Thunderhead unfortunately had a reputation for low intelligence, according to Mr. Incredible, which is corroborated in his NSA file. This would prove his undoing on November 15, 1958, when his cape caught on the fin of an outbound missile, tearing Thunderhead right out of his boots and gauntlets after he saved a woman and defeated the criminal responsible. He was one of the guests present at Mr. Incredible and Elastigirl's wedding.
  - His superpower involved control of the elements. He was killed by a version of the Omnidroid, as early as version X4 but before X9, during the training sessions for Operation Kronos.
 Universal Man - His superpower involved the ability to manipulate the atomic density of materials, and can alter the density of his own body to be as low as that of gas, to that of a black hole. The Operation Kronos database assigned him a threat rating of 2.9. Universal Man had the unlucky distinction of being the first "Super" killed by an Omnidroid, the Omnidroid v. X1, during the training sessions for Operation Kronos. In the "NSA Files" feature on Disc 2 of the DVD, an audio file of an interview with him reveals him to have had an Austrian accent, and was apparently conducted in a weightlifting gym, given the background sounds, indicating that Universal Man was a parody of Arnold Schwarzenegger, who won the Mr. Universe multiple times.
 Vectress - Her superpower was the ability to generate sub-sonic bursts. She was killed by the Omnidroid v. X4 during the training sessions for Operation Kronos.

Aspiring superheroes
The following are characters that aspire to be superheroes and appear in Incredibles 2:

 Karen (a.k.a. Voyd) (voiced by Sophia Bush) - A young Elastigirl fan who has the power of creating wormholes or warps for teleporting/displacing objects and people.
 Krushauer (voiced by Phil LaMarr) - An aspiring Super who has the power of telekinesis.
 He-Lectrix (voiced by Phil LaMarr) - An aspiring Super who has the power of controlling and projecting electrical currents.
 Gus Burns (a.k.a. Reflux) (voiced by Paul Eiding) - An elderly Super who has the power of heaving hot lava.
 Concretia "Connie" Mason (a.k.a. Brick) (voiced by Deirdre Warin) - A brick-themed aspiring Super with super-strength and invulnerability.
 Screech (voiced by Dee Bradley Baker) - An owl-like aspiring Super who has the ability of flight and a supersonic screech.

References

 
Lists of Disney animated film characters